Pat the Dog is an internationally co-produced computer-animated children's television series created by Patrick Ermosilla and produced by Superprod Studio and Animoka Studios, in co-production with Toon Factory (season 1), Grid Animation (season 1) and Rai Fiction (season 1), in partnership with the CNC and Pôle Image Magelis, with the participation of Télétoon+, Canal+ Family, Rai Com, La Trois, (season 1), OUFtivi (season 1), Ketnet (season 1), The Walt Disney Company France (season 2), France Télévisions (season 2) and Rai Ragazzi (season 2), and in association with Cofinova 12 (season 1) and SG Image 2018 (season 2). It is based on the mobile app game Space Dog by Sylvain Seynhaeve. The series is about Pat the dog's adventures as he tries to save his owner Lola from trouble. It debuted on La Trois in Belgium on April 3, 2017.

The series was very successful internationally and a season 2 is planned for 2020 with 63 episodes of 7 minutes and 4 specials of 22 minutes, as well as derivative episodes on Hoodie.

Plot
Pat the Dog is about the titular character who tries to save the day when his owner, Lola, is in trouble.

Characters

Main
 Pat – the protagonist of the series. He is an intelligent, brave, kind-hearted, mechanically-inclined dog hero who will go to any lengths to protect the ones for whom he cares.
 Lola – A girl who is Pat and Hoodie's owner. She has a special bond with Pat, but is often oblivious to the crazy adventures he goes on (which are more often than not revolved around her).
 Victor – A spoiled and trouble-making boy who is Lola's next-door neighbor. He is also the main antagonist of the series and comes from a wealthy family. He can also be considered Lola's rival. Unlike Lola, Victor's parents do not show their faces.

Recurring
 Hoodie – a cat who wears a hood and is also Lola's pet. He is very cute, fluffy and cheerful. He is also very harmless, because he never tries to hurt anyone. He can also get easily distracted by the birds who try to lure him into traps.He is also the one that Pat tries to save.
 Tank – Victor's dog. He is very loyal to his owner and can be considered to be Pat's rival. (Note: His design suggests it is possible that Tank is a dog of the pit bull breed.)
 The Triplet Birds – three rivals of Pat (Note: It is unknown why they have disagreements and become enemies of Pat the Dog.)
 Poulette – a featherless chicken who is always “bullied” by Pat, because she is always seen getting into accident or hit by Pat.
 Lucy – A girl who is Lola's best friend.
 Hugo – A boy who is also friend of Lola and Lucy.
 Mum – Lola's mother.
 Dad – Lola's father.

Production
Pat the Dog is co-produced by French companies Superprod Studio, Toon Factory (season 1), Télétoon+, and Canal+ Family, Italian companies Animoka Studios and Rai Fiction (season 1), and Belgian companies OUFtivi (season 1), Ketnet (season 1) and Grid Animation (season 1), in association with Cofinova 12 (season 1) and SG Image 2018 (season 2), and distributed by Superights Kids & Family Entertainment.

Broadcast
Pat the Dog debuted on La Trois in Belgium on April 3, 2017 and November 3, 2019. The series aired on Disney Channel on the Get Animated! block in the United States and Boomerang in Australia on June 3, and Boomerang in the United Kingdom and Ireland on July 3 and February 3.

Episodes

Season 1

Season 2

Notes

References

External links
 
  on Animoka Studios
  on Superights
  on Boomerang

2010s French animated television series
2017 French television series debuts
2019 French television series debuts
Belgian children's animated comedy television series
Belgian children's animated fantasy television series
French children's animated comedy television series
French children's animated fantasy television series
French computer-animated television series
Italian children's animated comedy television series
Italian children's animated fantasy television series
Italian computer-animated television series
French-language television shows
English-language television shows
Disney Channel original programming
Animated television series about dogs
Animated television series about cats
Animated television series about birds
La Trois original programming